Newman Levy (November 30, 1888 – March 22, 1966) was an American lawyer, poet, playwright and essayist.

Levy followed his father, well-known criminal attorney Abraham Levy, into law, but also pursued his own dreams of being a writer. Born in Manhattan, he graduated from New York University School of Law in 1911 and worked as an Assistant District Attorney, but found time to write three books of light verse and an autobiography. He socialized with New York's literary elite, and collaborated with Edna Ferber on $1200 a Year: A Comedy in Three Acts. When George Gershwin asked  "I wonder if my music will be played a hundred  years from now?" he is said to have answered, "Yes, if you're around to play it!"

Levy's Works 
His verse and short fiction was published in The New Yorker and also collected in three books: Opera Guyed, Theatre Guyed, and Gay But Wistful Verses.

His papers are collected at the Fales Library.

Thais 
Levy's poetical review of the opera Thaïs by Massenet is arguably his best known work. The complex rhyme scheme, light approach to a tragic opera, and bouncy tune helped popularize it. 
One time, in Alexandria, in wicked Alexandria,
Where nights were wild with revelry and life was but a game,
There lived, so the report is, an adventuress and courtesan, 
The pride of Alexandria, and Thais was her name.

And the tragic ending of Thaïs is reduced to a rueful reflection on missed chances:
The monk says, "That's a joke on me, for that there dame to croak on me.
I hadn't oughter passed her up the time I had the chance."

Bibliography

Poetry
Collections

List of poems

Memoirs

Essays and reporting

 Deems Taylor.

Critical studies and reviews of Levy's work

References 

1888 births
1966 deaths
American humorous poets
New York (state) lawyers
Writers from New York City
New York University School of Law alumni
American Jews
20th-century American lawyers